Utricularia sect. Foliosa is a section in the genus Utricularia. The species in this section are small or medium-sized terrestrial carnivorous plants native to North and South America.

See also 
 List of Utricularia species

References 

Utricularia
Plant sections